Wild Jimbos Two is the 1993 album by Wild Jimbos. Wild Jimbos is Jim Salestrom, Jimmy Ibbotson and Jim Ratts. Jim Salestrom was at that time a member of Dolly Parton's band.  Jimmy Ibbotson was at the time a member of the Nitty Gritty Dirt Band. He is notable for writing, singing and playing a variety of instruments on charting songs released by the Nitty Gritty Dirt Band. Jim Ratts is a member of Runaway Express.

Track listing
All tracks composed by Jimmy Ibbotson; except where noted.
"Rivers of Babylon" (Brent Dowe, Trevor McNaughton) - 1:50
"It's Morning" - 3:15
"No Big Thing" (Jimmy Ibbotson, Joe Henry) - 3:02
"We Can't Get Together" - 3:50
"Kelly Begs" - 2:54
"Julianna" - 4:03
"Wildwood" - 3:11
"Firelines" - 4:42
"The Pepperoni Song" - 2:30
"Warrior's Dream" - 4:38

Personnel
Jimmy Ibbotson - vocals, guitar
Jim Ratts - vocals
Jim Salestron - vocals, guitar, ukulele
with
Harry Bruckner - bass
Bill Brennan - drums
Charlie Provenza - mandolin
Chuck Salestrom - vocals
Daniel Jones - pedal steel guitar
Ron Jones - steel drum
Emelio Roberto Domingues - hand drums
Salli Severing Rattbo - vocals
Ted Cole - flute
Scott Bennett - guitar
Jill DeLage, Barbara Henry, John Brady, and Rattbo - kids chorus

Production
Producer - Jim Ratts

References
All information from album liner noted unless otherwise noted.

1991 albums
MCA Records albums